Henry William Lindow (8 March 1824 – 16 February 1887) was an English first-class cricketer.

Lindow was born at Cheltenham in March 1824. He lived at Moreton-in-Marsh when he was a child and was educated at Rugby School. He purchased a commission as a cornet in the 17th Lancers in July 1844. The following year he was promoted to the rank of lieutenant. He made his debut in first-class cricket for the Fast Bowlers in the Fast v Slow match of 1849 at Lord's. He made three further first-class appearances in 1849, appearing for the Marylebone Cricket Club against Oxford University, as well as playing twice for an All England Eleven against Kent and Hampshire. He scored 36 runs in his four matches, with a high score of 11. He died at Westminster in February 1887.

References

External links

1824 births
1887 deaths
People from Cheltenham
People educated at Rugby School
17th Lancers officers
English cricketers
Fast v Slow cricketers
Marylebone Cricket Club cricketers
All-England Eleven cricketers